Mount Bolanos is a south-west peak in the United States territory of Guam.

Nearby are located the Bolanos Conservation Reserve (0.4 km) and the Bolanos River (1.6 km). The closest populated places are the villages of Umatac (4.5 km) and Agat (9 km). Farther to the north is the capital Hagåtña (25 km). Mount Bolanos is a boundary point between the villages of Umatac, Talofofo, and Inarajan.

References 

Mountains of Guam
Umatac, Guam
Talofofo, Guam
Inalåhan, Guam